Vietnam, although a relatively young and small nation, has successfully established trade relations with dozens of countries worldwide. This is especially evident in the number of free trade agreements (FTAs) that the country has signed and is participating in. Being part of the Association of Southeast Asian Nations (ASEAN), economic opportunities for Vietnam expands beyond bilateral trade agreements with specific countries to include multilateral trade agreements via the ASEAN Free Trade Area (AFTA).

Bilateral free trade agreements 
Below is a list of all the bilateral trade agreements Vietnam is currently participating in, organized by partnering country.
 Chile: Vietnam-Chile Free Trade Agreement, signed 12 November 2011; came into effect on 4 February 2014.
 Cuba: Vietnam–Cuba Free Trade Agreement, signed 9 November 2018; came into effect on 1 April, 2020.
 Japan: Vietnam-–apan Economic Partnership Agreement (VJEPA), signed 25 December 2008; came into effect on 1 October 2009.
 South Korea: Vietnam–Korea Free Trade Agreement (VKFTA), signed 5 May, 2015; came into effect on 20 December, 2015.
 United Kingdom: UK–Vietnam Free Trade Agreement (UKVFTA), signed 29 December 2020; came into effect on 1 May 2021.
 US: US–Vietnam Bilateral Trade Agreement (BTA), signed 14 July 2000; came into effect on 10 December, 2001.

Multilateral free trade agreements 
Below is a list of all the multilateral trade agreements Vietnam is currently participating in, organized by partnering country/economic bloc.
 Association of Southeast Asian Nations (ASEAN): ASEAN Free Trade Area, signed 28 January, 1992; Vietnam joined ASEAN in 1995.
 Australia & New Zealand under ASEAN: ASEAN–Australia–New Zealand Free Trade Area, signed 27 February, 2009; came into effect on 1 January 2010.
 China under ASEAN: ASEAN–China Free Trade Area (ACFTA), signed 4 November 2002; came into effect on 1 July 2003.
 Comprehensive and Progressive Agreement for Trans-Pacific Partnership (CPTPP) (including Australia, Brunei, Canada, Chile, Japan, Malaysia, Mexico, New Zealand, Peru, Singapore, and Vietnam, signed 8 March 2018; came into effect on 30 December 2018.
 Eurasian Economic Union: Vietnam–Eurasian Economic Union Free Trade Agreement (VN-EAEU FTA), signed 29 May, 2015; came into effect on 5 October, 2016.
 European Union (EU): EU–Vietnam Free Trade Agreement, signed 30 June 2019; came into effect on 1 August 2020.
 India under ASEAN: ASEAN–India Free Trade Area, signed 13 August 2009; came into effect on 1 January 2010.
 Regional Comprehensive Economic Partnership (RCEP) (including Australia, Brunei, Cambodia, China, Indonesia, Japan, South Korea, Laos, Malaysia, Myanmar, New Zealand, the Philippines, Singapore, Thailand, and Vietnam), signed 15 November 2020; came into effect on 1 January 2022.

References 

Trade